Quadricyclane is a strained, multi-cyclic hydrocarbon with the formula CH2(CH)6.  A white volatile colorless liquid, it is highly strained molecule (78.7 kcal/mol). Isomerization of quadricyclane proceeds slowly at low temperatures. Because of quadricyclane’s strained structure and thermal stability, it has been studied extensively.

Preparation
Quadricyclane is produced by the irradiation of norbornadiene (bicyclo[2.2.1]hepta-2,5-diene) in the presence of Michler's ketone or ethyl Michler's ketone. Other sensitizers, such as acetone, benzophenone, acetophenone, etc., may be used but with a lesser yield. The yield is higher for freshly distilled norbornadiene, but commercial reagents will suffice.

Proposed applications to solar energy
The conversion of norbornadiene into quadricyclane is achievd with ~300nm UV radiation. . When converted back to norbornadiene, ring strain energy is liberated in the form of heat (ΔH = −89 kJ/mol). This reaction has been proposed to store solar energy. However, the absorption edge of light does not extend past 300 nm whereas most solar radiation has wavelengths longer than 400 nm. Quadricyclane’s relative stability and high energy content have also given rise to its use as a propellant additive or fuel. However, quadricyclane undergoes thermal decomposition at relatively low temperatures (less than 400 °C). This property limits its applications, as propulsion systems may operate at temperatures exceeding 500 °C.

Reactions
Quadricyclane readily reacts with acetic acid to give a mixture of nortricyclyl acetate and exo-norbornyl acetate. Quadricyclane also reacts with many dienophiles to form 1:1 adducts.

Notes

Hydrocarbons
Cyclopropanes
Tetracyclic compounds